UNCOL (Universal Computer Oriented Language) is a universal intermediate language for compilers. The idea was introduced in 1958, by a SHARE ad-hoc committee. It was never fully specified or implemented; in many ways it was more a concept than a language.

UNCOL was intended to make compilers economically available for each new instruction set architecture and programming language, thereby reducing an N×M problem to N+M.  Each machine architecture would require just one compiler back end, and each programming language would require one compiler front end. This was a very ambitious goal because compiler technology was in its infancy, and little was standardized in computer hardware and software.

History
The concept of such a universal intermediate language is old: the 
SHARE report (1958) already says "[it has] been discussed by many independent persons as long ago as 1954." Macrakis (1993) summarizes its fate:

UNCOL is sometimes used as a generic term for the idea of a universal intermediate language. The Architecture Neutral Distribution Format is an example of an UNCOL in this sense, as are various bytecode systems such as UCSD Pascal's p-code, and most notably Java bytecode.

See also
LLVM
GIMPLE

Notes

References

 Jean E. Sammet, Programming Languages: History and Fundamentals, Prentice-Hall, 1969. Chapter X.2: UNCOL (Significant Unimplemented Concepts), p. 708.
 SHARE Ad-Hoc Committee on Universal Languages (J. Strong, J. Olsztyn, J. Wegstein, O. Mock, A. Tritter, T. Steel), "The Problem of Programming Communication with Changing Machines", Communications of the ACM 1:8:12–18 (August 1958) and 1:9:9–15 (September 1958).
 Stavros Macrakis, "From UNCOL to ANDF: Progress in Standard Intermediate Languages", White Paper, Open Software Foundation Research Institute, RI-ANDF-TP2-1, January, 1992. Available at CiteSeer
 T.B. Steel, Jr., "UNCOL: Universal Computer Oriented Language Revisited", Datamation (Jan/Feb 1960), p. 18.
 T.B. Steel, Jr., "A First Version of UNCOL", Proc. Western Joint Computer Conference 19:371 (Los Angeles, May 9–11, 1961).
 T.B. Steel, Jr., "UNCOL: The Myth and the Fact", Annual Review in Automatic Programming 2:325 (1961).

Compilers